United Nations Security Council Resolution 1588, adopted unanimously on 17 March 2005, after recalling resolutions 1547 (2004), 1556 (2004), 1574 (2004) and 1585 (2005) on the situation in Sudan, the Council extended the mandate of the United Nations Advance Mission in Sudan (UNAMIS) for a period of one week.

The mandate was extended until 24 March 2005, to allow for further discussions by the Security Council on the issue. It was designed to prepare for the establishment of a peacekeeping operation in the region. Within a week, the United Nations Mission in Sudan would be established.

See also
 African Union Mission in Sudan
 United Nations–African Union Mission in Darfur
 International response to the War in Darfur
 List of United Nations Security Council Resolutions 1501 to 1600 (2003–2005)
 United Nations Mission in Sudan
 War in Darfur

References

External links
 
Text of the Resolution at undocs.org

 1588
2005 in Sudan
 1588
March 2005 events